Verdello-Dalmine is a railway station serving the towns of Verdello and Dalmine, in the region of Lombardy, northern Italy. The station opened in 1857 and is located on the Treviglio–Bergamo railway. The train services are operated by  Trenord.

History
The station was originally known as Verdello and the name was changed to Verdello-Dalmine in 1947.

Train services
The station is served by the following service(s):
Express services (Treno regionale) Milan - Pioltello - Verdello - Bergamo
Regional services (Treno regionale) Bergamo - Verdello - Treviglio

See also

History of rail transport in Italy
List of railway stations in Lombardy
Rail transport in Italy
Railway stations in Italy

References

 This article is based upon a translation of the Italian language version as of January 2016.

External links

Railway stations in Lombardy
Railway stations opened in 1857
1857 establishments in the Austrian Empire